Roosevelt Hall is a community auditorium and gymnasium building in Barrett, Minnesota, in Grant County.  The building was built by the Civil Works Administration, a predecessor of the Works Progress Administration, in 1934.  It was listed on the National Register of Historic Places in 1985 for being one of the few buildings built by the CWA in Minnesota.  The CWA made it possible for small communities such as Barrett to build architecturally sophisticated buildings at a low cost.  The building has also served as a social, cultural, and educational center for the community.

It is faced with western red cedar clapboard siding, and topped with a gabled roof with wood shingles.

The gymnasium was once used by the local public school, but after they built their own gymnasium in the early 1950s, the hall's use began to decline.  The original stage was removed in 1957, and the building housed a bowling alley for 14 years.  It then housed a youth center in 1973–1974, and it was used as an insulation manufacturing plant from 1977 through 1979.  The building is now used by the Prairie Wind Players, a community theater group.  The theater group built a proscenium stage in the early 1980s.  In 2004, the lobby was gutted and remodeled, with new restrooms and new ticket booths.

References

Cultural infrastructure completed in 1933
Buildings and structures in Grant County, Minnesota
Event venues on the National Register of Historic Places in Minnesota
New Deal in Minnesota
National Register of Historic Places in Grant County, Minnesota
1933 establishments in Minnesota
Civil Works Administration
Theatres in Minnesota
Gyms in the United States